The EcoSphere and "Original Ecosphere" are trademark names for sealed blown-glass miniature aquaria formerly produced by Ecosphere Associates, Inc., of Tucson, Arizona, United States.  Spherical or ovoid, the aquaria range  from roughly pool-ball-size to basket-ball-size. They are sold worldwide as scientific novelties and decorative objects.

The EcoSphere's main visual appeal is provided by tiny red-pink shrimp, Halocaridina rubra, between 1/4 and 3/8  inch (or approximately a centimeter) in length. The shrimp swim energetically around the aquarium, eat the brown bacterial and algal scum on the glass, consume the filamentous green algae which sometimes forms a globular pillow in the water, and perch on a fragment of soft coral.

The main conceptual interest of these objects lies in the fact that they are materially closed ecological systems which are self-sustaining over a period of years. At room temperature, and with only low inputs of light, the algae produce oxygen which supports the shrimp and bacteria. Bacteria break down the shrimps' wastes. The breakdown products provide nutrients to the algae and bacteria upon which the shrimp feed. The manufacturer states that shrimp live in the EcoSphere for an average of 2 to 3 years, and are known to live over 12 years.

A magnetic scrubber is enclosed in each EcoSphere.  By passing another magnet over the outside of the glass, the owner can manipulate the scrubber to clean the inside of the EcoSphere.

History
Research on closed ecosystems was initiated by Vladimir Vernadsky's 1926 book The Biosphere and Konstantin Tsiolkovsky in the 1950s and 1960s in Russia, culminating in the manned closed BIOS-3 facility, a 315 cubic meter habitat located at the Institute of Biophysics, Krasnoyarsk, Siberia. Frieda Taub reviewed work from 1953 to 1974. Another pioneer was Clair Folsom of the University of Washington  in the 1960s. On July 15, 1982, Joe Hanson of the NASA Jet Propulsion Laboratory (JPL) in Pasadena, California, held a workshop on "Closed Ecosystems".  In 1983 Loren Acker, President of Engineering and Research Associates, Inc.  obtained a NASA Spin-Off Technology license for the EcoSphere and with Daniel Harmony, in 1984 put the EcoSphere into full production.

Ecosphere Associates went out of business in early 2022.

Biota

The manufacturer does not reveal the  species of any of the components of the Ecosphere.  However, Hawaiian aquarists readily recognize the shrimp as  Halocaridina rubra or a very similar species. H. rubra is native to Hawaii, where it and other tiny shrimp occupy anchialine pools.  These are puddles or ponds located near shores and surrounded with lava rock.  The pores and chambers of the lava allow seawater to seep into the pools, where it mixes with freshwater from springs or rain. Anchialine shrimp are noted for their great adaptability:  they survive in pools of undiluted seawater and in brackish ponds; they tolerate water temperatures over 85 degrees Fahrenheit (near 30 degrees C) when the tropical sun heats up the shallowest anchialine pools, and they also thrive in cool water.

Prior to 2003, the EcoSpheres contained at least one snail at the time of purchase. However, the system is self-sustaining without the snails.  (The main function of the snails was aesthetic, as they cleaned scum from the glass.) The Gorgonia coral in EcoSpheres is dead and plays no active biological role in the system, however it does increase the surface area for beneficial bacteria and algae, and the calcium carbonate in the coral acts as a pH buffering agent.

Concerns
A major concern is that the shrimp’s sole habitat is shrinking, with over 90% of Hawaii’s anchialine pools having disappeared due to development, and this species of shrimp is disappearing along with them.

Comparable objects and systems

Commercially packaged aquarium kits, including algae, anchialine be left open or closed, are available in Hawaii. The customer can combine these to create an aquarium comparable to the EcoSphere.

It is possible to purchase Halocaridina shrimp from Hawaiian aquarium dealers and create home-made sealed aquaria with no other special supplies. Sand, gravel, crushed shell, and very well cycled filtered water from a successful saltwater aquarium, with the lowest attainable ammonia content, should be used. A small inoculation of live Spirulina algae may be introduced.  Certain ubiquitous algae and bacteria are likely to be carried by the shrimp themselves and will soon colonize the walls of the container.  There is a risk that pathogens also may be introduced.

The Ecosphere can degrade with time. It is "self-sustaining" in comparison to systems which degrade much more quickly.

The advantage of an aquarium closed with a lid (rather than a permanently sealed plug, which is found in the base of an EcoSphere) is that if the system goes out of equilibrium, the owner can remedy conditions and prevent a complete die-off.  Intervention to maintain good water quality allows a larger number of shrimp to live in the open system than can survive in the relatively poor quality closed environment.

Freshwater closed systems are often attempted by nature hobbyists and as experimental projects or demonstrations for biology classes.  These require nothing more than a large glass jar with an airtight lid, a few cups of lake or river water, and mud or other substrate from the same body of water.  Kept indoors at room temperatures, with exposure to sunlight from a window, such systems have been found to contain living organisms even after several decades.  The original level of diversity always falls drastically, sometimes exhibiting interesting patterns of population flux and extinction.  Multicellular organisms fare poorly.  Eventually an equilibrium of micro-organisms is established.

Make magazine Volume 10 contained instructions for creating a self-contained fresh-water "biosphere", which contained a freshwater amano shrimp, snails, amphipods, ostracods, copepods, rigid hornwort, duckweed, pond scum (for microorganisms), and small rocks or shells (as a pH buffer).

In their paper "The Emergence of Materially-closed-system Ecology", Joe Hanson and Clair Folsome discussed the creation of Ecosphere-like closed ecosystems. In the paper Hanson stated that the composition of the closed ecosystems he created was 50% distilled water brought to a salinity of 11 parts per thousand by the addition of "Instant Ocean", 50% air, algae collected from the ponds of Halocaridina rubra shrimp (and their associated microbial populations), and 3 to 16 Halocaridina rubra shrimp (and their associated microbial populations). No container size was given. However, in similar, 2,000 ml setups the authors noted that while the survival rate of shrimp varies it averages 4 shrimp per 2,000 ml of container when not carbon, sulfur, or phosphorus limited or 1 to 8 shrimp per 1,000 ml when limited. They also noted that the shrimp population in all ecosystems declined from the starting number to a steady state within 60 days.

In the media
The ecosphere was reviewed by Carl Sagan in a 1986 Parade magazine article entitled "The World That Came in the Mail". The article is reprinted as a chapter in Sagan's last book, Billions and Billions.

References

Ecological experiments
Controlled ecological life support systems
Artificial ecosystems
Products introduced in 1984